William Buck may refer to:
William Buck (baseball), American baseball player and umpire
William Buck (translator) (1933–1970), American writer who produced English versions of the Mahabharata and Ramayana
William Buck of the Buck baronets
Bill Buck (environmentalist), American environmentalist and producer
Bill Buck (cricketer) (born 1946), English cricketer
Bill Buck (footballer) (1900–1980), Australian footballer

See also
Buck (surname)